The  is a commuter electric multiple unit (EMU) train type operated by the private railway operator Seibu Railway in Japan since March 2017.  a total of 13 ten-car trainsets have been built by Kawasaki Heavy Industries in Kobe from 2016, with the first trains entering service on 25 March 2017.

Design
The new 40000 series trains were built by Kawasaki Heavy Industries in Kobe from January 2016, with deliveries scheduled to continue from fiscal 2016 to 2019. This is the first time that trains for Seibu Railway have been built by this manufacturer.

The new trains are designed as an evolution of the 30000 series "Smile Train" concept, and are intended to be passenger-friendly.

Operations
The 40000 series trains operate on Seibu Ikebukuro Line, Seibu Shinjuku Line, and Seibu Haijima Line services. Some trainsets operate on reserved-seat supplementary-fare S-Train services between the Seibu Ikebukuro Line and Tokyo Metro Yurakucho Line on weekdays and between the Seibu Chichibu Line and Minato Mirai Line (via the Tokyo Metro Fukutoshin Line and Tōkyū Tōyoko Line) at weekends since 25 March 2017.

Formation
The 40000 series EMUs are ten-car sets formed as follows, with five motored ("M") cars and five non-powered trailer ("T") cars, and car 1 at the Hanno (i.e. northern) end.

Cars 2, 5, and 8 each have one single-arm pantograph. Car 4 has a universal access toilet.

40050 subseries 
Due to the use of fixed longitudinal seating throughout, the 40050 subseries EMUs are slightly lighter and accommodate more passengers than the 40000 series trains.

Cars 2, 5, and 8 each have one single-arm pantograph.

Interior
The trains' interiors use LED lighting, and pairs of LCD passenger information screens are provided both above the doorways and suspended form the ceilings. A "Partner zone" area is provided at the end of car 10 with perch seats and space for wheelchairs and large luggage. This area also has larger windows. "Plasmacluster" air-purification technology is used for the first time on Seibu Railway trains.

40000 series 
Passenger accommodation consists primarily of rotating pairs of seats can be arranged in either longitudinal or transverse arrangements, known as "LONG/CROSS" seats.

40050 series 
Passenger accommodation consists of fixed longitudinal bench seating throughout. These seats are referred to as "LONG" seats.

History

Details of the new trains were officially announced in August 2015. The first trainset, 40101, was delivered from the Kawasaki Heavy Industries factory in Kobe to Seibu's Kotesashi Depot in September 2016.

The first sets entered revenue service on S-Train services on 25 March 2017.

In 2019, Seibu announced plans to procure two new 40000 series trainsets. These sets, numbered 40151 and 40152, were built with fixed longitudinal bench seating throughout; in contrast, older sets feature rotating seats. Two additional sets with fixed longitudinal seating were announced in 2020 as part of the operator's investment plan for fiscal 2020, followed by another three for 2021.

Build histories

The manufacturers and delivery dates for the fleet are as shown below.

Notes

See also
 Tobu 50090 series and 70090 series, Tobu Railway commuter EMU types that also features rotating longitudinal/transverse seating
 Keio 5000 series, a Keio commuter EMU type that also features rotating longitudinal/transverse seating
 Keikyu 2100 series, a Keikyu commuter EMU type that also features transverse seating
 Keikyu N1000 series, another Keikyu commuter EMU type also features rotating transverse seating (batch 20 only)

References

External links

 Official news release 
 Kawasaki Heavy Industries press release 

Electric multiple units of Japan
40000 series
Train-related introductions in 2017
1500 V DC multiple units of Japan
Kawasaki multiple units